The SdsR/RyeB RNA is a non-coding RNA that was identified in a large scale screen of E. coli. The exact 5′ and 3′ ends of this RNA are uncertain. This RNA overlaps the SraC/RyeA RNA on the opposite strand suggesting that the two may act in a concerted manner. It is transcribed by general stress factor σs and is most highly expressed in stationary phase. SdsR/RyeB RNA interacts with Hfq.

The homologous sRNA in S. enterica was shown to regulate synthesis of major porin OmpD. A study using Salmonella identified 20 targets of this sRNA including transcriptional regulator, CRP,  global DNA-binding factors, StpA and HupB, the antibiotic transporter protein, TolC, and the RtsA/B two-component system (TCS), and validated their post-transcriptional control by SdsR/RyeB RNA.

See also 
RydB RNA
RyhB RNA
RyeE RNA

References

External links 

Non-coding RNA